The motor ship Ranga was a 1,586 tonne container ship owned by the Spanish shipping company, Naviera Ason SA, but on charter to the Icelandic shipping company, Hafskip. She was formerly named Berta de Perez, but her name was changed at sea to Ranga, due to the Icelandic charter. The Ranga was on her maiden voyage from Vigo to Reykjavík under Captain Miguel Ángel Díaz Madariaga.

Rescue
The local rescue team comprising members of Dingle Fire Brigade, the Garda Síochána and emergency services, rescued some of the fifteen crew members by Breeches buoy. The remainder were taken off by an RAF helicopter. Captain Miguel Ángel Díaz Madariaga was the last to be rescued and dropped off the vessel.

Disposal
The ship was a total loss and created oil pollution as she broke up. The ship broke into two parts quickly, the stern of the ship, with the superstructure on, and the bows. In 1989, the company Eurosalve tried to scrap her, but this failed due to the inaccessibility of the wreck. The stern section of the wreck was removed in 1991, due to filming of Far and Away, which included a scene shot at Dunmore Head. Today, only the bow and some other scattered pieces of wreckage are still visible.

See also
Dingle peninsula

References
 Bourke, EJ. (1994). Shipwrecks of the Irish Coast Volume 1, p. 157.  .
 
 "Los Barcos de Pérez Y Cía", 2001.

External links

Container ships
Maritime incidents in 1982
Shipwrecks of Ireland
1980 ships
Ships sunk with no fatalities